FC Pivdenstal Yenakiieve was a Ukrainian football club from Yenakiieve, Donetsk Oblast.

History
It is a club of the Yenakiyeve Iron and Steel Works. The club won the 2001 Ukrainian Amateur Cup.

References

 
Pivdenstal Yenakiieve, FC
Football clubs in Donetsk Oblast
Yenakiieve
Association football clubs established in 1913
Association football clubs disestablished in 2005
1913 establishments in the Russian Empire
2005 disestablishments in Ukraine